Jimmy Elwood (12 June 1901 in Belfast, Ireland – 30 November 1936) was a former Irish footballer who played as a centre-half.

He played for Glentoran FC, Manchester City FC, Chesterfield FC, Bradford Park Avenue and Derry City FC. He was capped twice for Ireland in 1929. 

Elwood died in 1937 aged 36.

External links
Northern Ireland's footballing greats

Irish association footballers (before 1923)
Pre-1950 IFA international footballers
Glentoran F.C. players
Manchester City F.C. players
Chesterfield F.C. players
Derry City F.C. players
1901 births
1937 deaths
Association footballers from Belfast
Association football midfielders
Bradford (Park Avenue) A.F.C. players